Parasunathar Temple (பரசுநாதர் கோயில்) is a Hindu temple located at Muzhaiyur near Kumbakonam in the Thanjavur district of Tamil Nadu, India. The temple is dedicated to Shiva.

Legend 
According to Hindu mythology, the sage Parasurama worshipped Shiva at Muzhaiyur as a penance for having killed his own mother and incurred Brahmahatti dosha. The temple was visited by the Saivite sage Thirunavukkarasar. Hymns in praise of the temple have been sung by Appar and Sundarar.

Vaippu Sthalam
It is one of the shrines of the Vaippu Sthalams sung by Tamil Saivite Nayanar Appar.

Presiding deitys 
The presiding deity is known as Parasunathar. The Goddess is known as Gnanambika.  The presiding deity is in the form of shivalinga. There are also idols of Murugan, Vinayaka and  Parashurama

References

External links
 

Shiva temples in Thanjavur district
Padal Petra Stalam